David Robinson (born 1965) is an American former basketball player who played for Navy and the San Antonio Spurs.

David Robinson may also refer to:

Entertainment and media
Dave Robinson (music executive), co-founder of Stiff Records
David G. Robinson (theatre pioneer) (19th century), theatrical pioneer in Northern California
David Robinson (journalist) (1927–2017), Lincolnshire journalist and author
David Robinson (film critic) (born 1930), British film critic and author
David Robinson (drummer) (born 1949), American rock drummer, most notably for The Cars
David Robinson (reggae singer) (fl. 1970s-1980s), Jamaican reggae singer
David Robinson (photographer) (born 1973), British photographer and publisher
David Robinson (artist) (born 1964), Canadian artist
David C. Robinson, American film producer

Politics
David I. Robinson (1844–1921), American politician in Massachusetts
David Robinson (Irish politician) (1882–1943), Irish Fianna Fáil politician and revolutionary
David Robinson (New Zealand politician) (fl. 1980s), former New Zealand politician of the Labour Party
David J. Robinson (fl. 2000s), former member of the Ohio House of Representatives

Religion
David Robinson (bishop), Australian bishop, current bishop of Rockhampton
David Robinson (priest) (1931–2003), Archdeacon of Blackburn

Sports
David Robinson (English cricketer) (born 1938), English cricketer
Dave Robinson (American football) (born 1941), American football player
Dave Robinson (rugby league) (born 1944), English rugby league footballer of the 1960s and 1970s
Dave Robinson (baseball) (born 1946), American baseball player
Dave Robinson (footballer, born 1948) (1948–2016), English footballer
David Robinson (Australian cricketer) (born 1958), Australian cricketer
David Robinson (footballer, born 1965), English footballer
David Robinson (footballer, born 1969), English footballer

Others
David C. Robinson (steamboat captain) (1833–1874), steamboat captain on the Colorado River from 1857 to 1873
Paschal Robinson or David Robinson (1870–1948), Irish ecclesiastical diplomat
David Moore Robinson (1880–1958), American classical archaeologist
David "Chippy" Robinson (1897–1967), St. Louis armed robber and contract killer
David Robinson (philanthropist) (1904–1987), British entrepreneur and philanthropist
David Robinson (horticulturist) (1928–2004), Irish horticultural scientist
David Robinson (community worker) (fl. 1970s–2020s), British community worker and writer
David A. Robinson (born 1954), retired U.S. Air Force general
David B. Robinson (born 1939), retired U.S. Navy vice admiral
David K. Robinson (born 1954), professor of European history
David M. Robinson (born 1965), American orientalist 
David G. Robinson (data scientist) (fl. 2010s–2020s), American data scientist
David Mark Robinson, Australian who, in May 2003, attempted to hijack Qantas Flight 1737

See also
David Fullerton Robison (1816–1859), member of the U.S. House of Representatives from Pennsylvania